Walter Muir (born December 1, 1953) is Scottish-born Canadian former footballer who played as a forward.

Career 
Muir played in the Toronto & District Soccer League in 1968 with Toronto Celtic. In 1969, he played with Toronto Irish, and assisted in securing the First Division title. The following season he returned to Toronto Celtic and won the Consols Cup by defeating Toronto Emerald. In 1971, he played in the North American Soccer League with the Toronto Metros. In his debut season he appeared in 20 matches and recorded five goals. He re-signed with Toronto for the 1972 season.

In 1973, he signed for another season with the Metros. For the remainder of the 1973 season he played in the National Soccer League with Toronto First Portuguese.

References 

Living people
1953 births
Association football forwards
Scottish footballers
Canadian soccer players
Toronto Blizzard (1971–1984) players
Toronto First Portuguese players
North American Soccer League (1968–1984) players
Canadian National Soccer League players
People from Tranent